Eduard Aleksandrovich Buliya (born 19 May 1991) is a Russian professional football player.

Club career
He made his Russian Football National League debut for FC Shinnik Yaroslavl on 21 April 2010 in a game against FC Nizhny Novgorod.

External links
 
 

1991 births
Sportspeople from Ivanovo
Russian people of Abkhazian descent
Living people
Russian footballers
Association football forwards
FC Shinnik Yaroslavl players
FC SKA-Khabarovsk players
FC Rotor Volgograd players
FC Sever Murmansk players
FC Tekstilshchik Ivanovo players
FC Olimp-Dolgoprudny players